Church of the Sacred Heart of Jesus in Grabowo Królewskie - church is located in Grabowo Królewskie (Greater Poland Voivodeship, Września County, Kołaczkowo Commune) Church was built between 1925 and 1927. It was built on the site of the old church, which for a period building is still working and only when new already embraced it in its entirety, has been demolished and devotion moved to the current building.  During the years Nazi occupation, as the only local church acted legally and openly. At the time it was granted a number of baptisms, marriages and funerals, not just residents Grabowo Królewskie and surrounding villages.

Description
It was designed by Henryk Jackowski("Polichromia”). The vault of the chancel has been exposed sky with golden stars. The founders of the church was married Wanda and Witold Wilkoszewscy, owners of property in Grabowo Królewskie. Architect who designed the church was Stanisław Mieczkowski.

Gallery

Bibliography

Września County
Grabowo Królewskie
20th-century Roman Catholic church buildings in Poland
Roman Catholic churches completed in 1927